Weiping Wu is a China urban specialist and Professor at Columbia University's Graduate School of Architecture, Planning and Preservation, where she directs the Urban Planning program. In 2022, she was appointed interim dean.

Wu was appointed as the President of the Association of Collegiate Schools of Planning (ACSP) from Fall 2017 through Fall 2019, and was editor of ACSP's Journal of Planning Education and Research from 2008 to 2012.

Education
Wu holds a Ph.D. in Urban Planning and Policy Development from Rutgers University, and a master's degree in Urban Planning and a bachelor's degree in Architecture from Tsinghua University (China).

Academic life
Wu is a Professor of Urban Planning at Columbia GSAPP and Director of the M.S. Urban Planning program. Before joining Columbia University in 2016, she was Professor and Chair in the Department of Urban and Environmental Policy and Planning at Tufts University. She is also on the faculty of the Weatherhead East Asian Institute at Columbia.

Publications
 2012 The Chinese City, Weiping Wu, Piper Gaubatz, Routledge 
“Migrant Housing in Urban China: Choices and Constraints.” Urban Affairs Review 38, no. 1 (September 2002): 90–119. https://doi.org/10.1177/107808702401097817.

References

Chinese architects
Living people
Year of birth missing (living people)
Columbia Graduate School of Architecture, Planning and Preservation faculty

Tufts University faculty
Tsinghua University alumni
Rutgers University alumni
Weatherhead East Asian Institute faculty